Omnivium is the third studio album released by German death metal band Obscura, and the second album of Obscura's four album concept. The album was recorded at Woodshed Studio in southern Germany with engineer Victor Bullok (also known as V.Santura). It was released by Relapse Records on 29 March 2011.

The album is based on Friedrich Schelling's Clara: or On Nature's Connection to the Spirit World (1810).

Obscura released the track "Septuagint" to the public on 19 January 2011.
The second song from Omnivium, "Vortex Omnivium", was released to the public on 24 February 2011.
The limited edition album included a bonus track, a cover of Cacophony's "Concerto", an embroidered Obscura patch, a guitar pick, and an album cover sticker.

Omnivium debuted at #11 on the USA's Top Heatseekers chart, and at #14 on Germany's Media Control Newcomer chart., furthermore, within the first week the album sold 2,000 copies in the US.

Track listing

Credits 
Writing, performance and production credits are adapted from the album liner notes.

Personnel 

Obscura
 Steffen Kummerer – guitar, vocals
 Christian Münzner – guitar
 Jeroen Paul Thesseling – bass
 Hannes Grossmann – drums

Guest musicians
 Tommy Talamanca – guitar solo on "Euclidean Elements"
 Morean – guitar solo on "Velocity" 

Production
 Obscura – production, recording, mixing, mastering
 V. Santura (Dark Fortress, Triptykon) – production, recording, mixing, mastering

Artwork and design
 Orion Landau – design
 Christian Weiss – photography

Charts

References

External links 
 

2011 albums
Obscura (band) albums
Relapse Records albums
Friedrich Wilhelm Joseph Schelling